Jeanne Field Spallone (January 18, 1928 – August 5, 2008) was an American judge, journalist, and state legislator in Connecticut.

Jeanne Carol Field was a native of New York City, born to parents Flora Kopp Field and Charles William Field. Field attended New York University before transferring to the University of Connecticut, from which she graduated in 1950. She was married, in 1950, to Daniel F. Spallone, who later became a judge of the Connecticut Appellate Court. James Spallone is their son. The Spallone family resided in Deep River, Connecticut, and from 1962, spent summers at Block Island.

Jeanne Spallone became an assistant to Chester Bowles, was a member of the Deep River Democratic Town Committee for five decades, and sought election to the Connecticut House of Representatives three times, serving from 1959 to 1961. Throughout the 1950s to the 1970s, Spallone was a journalist for The Middletown Press and authored a book on local history titled A Watch to Keep about American Revolutionary War veterans. Between 1978 and 1994, Spallone was an elected probate judge. At the time of her death on August 5, 2008, Spallone was working on a children's book.

References

1928 births
2008 deaths
20th-century American women politicians
20th-century American politicians
Women state legislators in Connecticut
University of Connecticut alumni
20th-century American judges
People from Deep River, Connecticut
20th-century American women judges
American women journalists
Journalists from Connecticut
20th-century American women writers
20th-century American journalists
Probate court judges in the United States
Connecticut Democrats
Historians of Connecticut
Politicians from New York City
20th-century American historians
American women historians
Journalists from New York City
Connecticut state court judges